Line Music (stylized as LINE MUSIC) is a subscription-based music streaming service by Line Corporation that combines existing Line Messenger app with the entertainment system that users not only can stream the music on-demand, but users can share the music directly to Line messenger. The chairman for the Line Music division is Lim-Suk Jun. The Line Music app is an alternative version of Naver VIBE in South Korea.

History

Announcement
In December 2014, Line Corporation reveals their plan to expanding their Line product range beyond their messaging service Line to provide a one-stop entertainment portal where users can use Line services to consume media, in which these plan has been made in October 2014. This expansion has been announced during the Line annual event, on the same time the company also announces the introduction of online Manga service and also new game ventures, with investment of music streaming division worth ¥480 million. Line Corporation, in the early stage, has signed the deals with Sony Music Japan and Avex Group to allows their works to be streamed in their services once the service has been launched. Following the announcement on the same month, Line Corporation acquired MixRadio from Microsoft in order to make its expansion to music industry globally. Line Corporation, however stated that the MixRadio will continue to operate separately from parent company.

Launch in Thailand
Line Music was initially launched in Thailand where Thailand is the second largest Line messenger market share in the world after Japan, with 33 million registered users using this service,
compared to the Japanese market with 58 million registered users. Line has signed deals with major labels in Thailand such as RS Music, BEC-TERO, SpicyDisc and What The Duck to allow their works to be streamed in this service.

On 25 August 2016, Line Thailand announced their intention to shut down and move to Line TV on 1 October 2016.

Expansion to Japan
On 11 June 2015, Line Corporation launched the Line Music in Japan, with new deals with major labels has been signed such as Warner Music Group, Universal Music Group and King Records.

Expansion to Taiwan
On 10 July 2019, Line Corporation started to provide Line Music service in Taiwan.

Features

Catalogue
At the launch, Line currently has 1.5 million licensed tracks from 30 music labels and publishers worldwide. But the company will expand their catalogue to 30 million licensed tracks by 2016.

Integration with Line messenger
One of the main features of the Line Music is the integration with the Line Messenger where users can send the music track or playlists to friends or chat group in Line Messenger. In addition, users can stream the music simultaneously with the person the user is chatting with in order to hear the music at the same time. A user without a Line Music subscription can preview the music for up to 30 seconds only.

Promotion
On 11 July 2015, Line Corporation air its first television commercial about Line Music in Japan. In this video, a girl is dancing and singing at home while listening to Carly Rae Jepsen's latest single, I Really Like You.

Competition
Before the launch of the Line Music in Thailand, Deezer, Rdio and Tidal were the only competitors in the Thai music streaming market, at the time where other major services such as Spotify are still absent in Thai market.

However, unlike in Thailand, Japan did not have any major streaming services launched in their country such as Spotify, Rdio, Deezer, Xbox Music, Pandora Radio etc., with the exception of Music Unlimited by Sony Entertainment Network prior to the launch of Line Music. However the pricing for the monthly subscription of Music Unlimited was high at ¥1,480 due to Sony's monopolistic practices and also their decision to withhold their catalogues from iTunes Store until end of 2012. However, after the closure of the Music Unlimited and with the Sony's announcement to replace its service with PlayStation Music which is powered by Spotify on 28 January 2015. On 30 June 2015, Apple launched Apple Music worldwide, which makes it the third competitor in music streaming industry in Japan.

Availability

Line Music is currently available in Japan, Thailand and Taiwan.

Reception
The reception for the Line Music was well received by the customers in both Japan and Thailand with 6.2 million downloads within the first months of availability.

Accounts and subscriptions
Line Music provides different types of accounts, vary by countries. Currently, Line Music provide free-tier account in Taiwan.

See also
 Naver VIBE

References

External links
 Official website

2015 software
Music streaming services
Android (operating system) software
Online music stores of Japan
Jukebox-style media players
Naver Corporation
IOS software
2015 establishments in Japan
2015 establishments in Thailand
2016 disestablishments in Thailand
2019 establishments in Taiwan